Molay-ye Sefid (also Romanized as Molāy-ye Sefīd; also known as Molah-ye Sefīd and Mollā-ye Sefīd) is a village in Poshtkuh-e Rostam Rural District, Sorna District, Rostam County, Fars Province, Iran. At the 2006 census, its population was 51, in 8 families.

References 

Populated places in Rostam County